Dante Carlos Rossi (born 12 July 1987) is a footballer who plays as a centre-back for Foligno on loan from Cattolica. Born in Argentina, he represents the San Marino national team.

International career
Rossi was born in Argentina and is of Sammarinese descent through a great-grandfather. Rossi made his international debut for San Marino on 5 September 2020 in the UEFA Nations League against Gibraltar.

Career statistics

International

References

External links
 
 

1987 births
Living people
Sportspeople from Buenos Aires Province
Sammarinese footballers
San Marino international footballers
Argentine footballers
Sammarinese people of Argentine descent
Sportspeople of Argentine descent
Argentine people of Sammarinese descent
Association football central defenders
S.S. Pennarossa players